Clathrodrillia flavidula, common name the javelin turrid, is a species of sea snail, a marine gastropod mollusk in the family Drilliidae.

Description
The shell is rather thin, turreted, longitudinally obliquely ribbed and crossed by revolving lines. The color of the shell is yellowish white to brown, the lighter-colored specimens sometimes indistinctly broadly fasciated with brown. Its length is 65 mm and its diameter 20 mm.

Distribution
This marine species is found in the Red Sea ; off the Philippines, China and Japan; off Australia (Northern Territory, Queensland, Western Australia)

References

 Lamarck, J.B.P.A. de M. 1822. Histoire naturelle des Animaux sans Vertèbres. Paris : J.B. Lamarck Vol. 7 711 pp
 Reeve, L.A. 1843. Monograph of the genus Pleurotoma. pls 1–18 in Reeve, L.A. (ed.). Conchologica Iconica. London : L. Reeve & Co. Vol. 1.
 Martin, K. 1895. Die Fossilien von Java auf Grund einer Sammlung von Dr. R.D.M. Verbeek. Sammlung des Geologischen Reichsmuseums in Leiden 1(2): 1–132, pls 1–20 
 Grant, U.S. (IV) & Gale, H.R. 1931. Catalogue of the marine Pliocene and Pleistocene mollusca of California and adjacent regions with notes on their morphology, classification, and nomenclature and a special treatment of the Pectinidae and the Turridae (including a few Miocene and Recent species). Memoirs of the San Diego Society of Natural History 1: 1–1036, pl. 1–32
 Oostingh, C.H. 1939. Die Mollusken des Pliocaens von Sued-Bantam in Java. Publications of the Mijnbouw in Nederlandsch-Indië. Geological Magazine 6(12): 163–187, pls 14–16 
 Yen, T.C. 1942. A review of the Chinese gastropods in the British Museum. Proceedings of the Malacological Society of London 24(5/6): 170–290 
 Hinton, A. 1972. Shells of New Guinea and the Central Indo-Pacific. Milton : Jacaranda Press xviii 94 pp. 
 Springsteen, F.J. & Leobrera, F.M. 1986. Shells of the Philippines. Manila : Carfel Seashell Museum 377 pp., 100 pls.
 Vine, P. (1986). Red Sea Invertebrates. Immel Publishing, London. 224 pp.
 Kosuge, S. 1992. Report on the family Turridae collected along the north-western coast of Australia (Gastropoda). Bulletin of the Institute of Malacology, Tokyo 2(10): pls 58–59, text figs 1–24
 Wells, F.E. 1994. A revision of the Recent Australian species of the turrid genera Inquisitor and Ptychobela. Journal of the Malacological Society of Australasia 15: 71–102
 Wilson, B. 1994. Australian Marine Shells. Prosobranch Gastropods. Kallaroo, WA : Odyssey Publishing Vol. 2 370 pp. 
 Higo, S., Callomon, P. & Goto, Y. 1999. Catalogue and Bibliography of the Marine Shell-bearing Mollusca of Japan. Japan : Elle Scientific Publications 749 pp.

External links
 
  Baoquan Li 李宝泉 & R.N. Kilburn, Report on Crassispirinae Morrison, 1966 (Mollusca: Neogastropoda: Turridae) from the China Seas; Journal of Natural History 44(11):699–740 · March 2010; DOI: 10.1080/00222930903470086

flavidula
Gastropods described in 1822